Miyoda Cliff is a rock cliff rising to about  at the northeast end of the Rock Pile Peaks, Bermel Peninsula, Antarctica, marking the south entrance point to Solberg Inlet, Bowman Coast. The cliff was photographed from the air by the United States Antarctic Service in 1940, the U.S. Navy in 1966, and was surveyed by the Falkland Islands Dependencies Survey, 1946–48. It was named by the Advisory Committee on Antarctic Names in 1977 for Larry W. Miyoda, Station Manager, Palmer Station, 1976; engineer, Siple Station, 1974.

References

Cliffs of Graham Land
Bowman Coast